Niwot is an unincorporated town, a post office, and a census-designated place (CDP) located in and governed by Boulder County, Colorado, United States. The CDP is a part of the Boulder, Colorado Metropolitan Statistical Area. The Niwot post office has the ZIP Codes 80503 and 80544 (for post office boxes). At the United States Census 2020, the population of the Niwot CDP was 4,306.

History
Niwot is named for Arapaho Chief Niwot, a tribal leader in the Boulder area during the nineteenth century. The name means "left-handed".

The town of Niwot was first platted in 1875 along either side of the Colorado Central Railroad. Initially, the town's commercial district was to the west of the railroad, while the residential was to the east. By the early 1900s, the bulk of the town shifted to the east side of the track, while the buildings to the west were either relocated or burned down.

This locality is recognized for being the headquarters of footwear company Crocs, Inc. for more than a decade prior to June 2020.

Geography
Niwot is located along State Highway 119, halfway between Boulder and Longmont.

Climate

Demographics
As of the 2020 census, there were 4,306 people and 1,541 households residing in the CDP.  The population density was 1,076.5 people per square mile. The racial makeup of the CDP was 86.2% White, 0.9% African American, 0.3% Native American, 4.7% Asian, 0.1% Pacific Islander, 3.1% from other races, and 4.6% from two or more races. Hispanic or Latino of any race were 5.1% of the population.

According to the U.S. Census Bureau's American Community Survey data estimates for 2019, there were 1,541 households, out of which 31.9% had children under the age of 18 living with them, 63.4% were married couples living together, and 28.5% were non-families. The average household size was 2.51 and the average family size was 3.00.

The median income for a household in the CDP was $118,914, and the median income for a family was $179,038. Males had a median income of $81,813 versus $39,279 for females. The per capita income for the CDP was $74,961.  About 2.9% of families and 6.0% of the population were below the poverty line, including 3.8% of those under age 18 and 3.8% of those age 65 or over.

Education
Niwot is served by the St. Vrain Valley School District.

Notable residents
Brian Dietzen, American actor who has played the supporting role of Jimmy Palmer on NCIS, since 2004. Dietzen attended Niwot High School and was the star of the drama department.
Neil Gorsuch, U.S. Supreme Court Justice.
Alan Stern, planetary scientist
Pete Wernick, five-string banjo player who has been involved in the bluegrass music scene since the 1970s.

Notable facts
In 2013, downtown Niwot was used as the set for the Leonardo DiCaprio-produced film Dear Eleanor, which featured actors such as Jessica Alba and Luke Wilson.

See also

Outline of Colorado
Index of Colorado-related articles
State of Colorado
Colorado cities and towns
Colorado census designated places
Colorado counties
Boulder County, Colorado
List of statistical areas in Colorado
Front Range Urban Corridor
North Central Colorado Urban Area
Denver-Aurora-Boulder, CO Combined Statistical Area
Boulder, CO Metropolitan Statistical Area
Chief Niwot

References

External links

Niwot @ Niwot Business Association
Niwot @ Colorado.com
Niwot @ UncoverColorado.com
Town Story: Niwot
St. Vrain Valley School District
Niwot High School
Boulder County website

Census-designated places in Boulder County, Colorado
Census-designated places in Colorado
Colorado placenames of Native American origin
1873 establishments in Colorado Territory